LUX – the European Audience Film Award by the European Parliament and the European Film Academy, also known as LUX European Audience Film Award and commonly known as the LUX Prize or LUX Film Prize, is a prize given to a competing film by the European Parliament and the European Film Academy, in partnership with the European Commission and Europa Cinemas. Introduced in 2007, the prize is named after the Latin word for "light", lux. Between its first edition in 2007 and 2019, its official name was the European Parliament LUX Award.
 
The award is aimed at highlighting films which help to raise awareness of socio-political issues in Europe and to publicise and encourage distribution of European films in the European Union and throughout the world. Open to both fiction (narrative) and documentary films of feature length, entries are limited to films made within Europe and demonstrating European values and/or showcasing European culture. The finalists gain both publicity and enhanced prospects for worldwide distribution through having their films subtitled into the official 24 European languages as part of the award process.

Until 2020 the prize was awarded  the European Parliament only, and voting was based on voting by Members of the European Parliament, but for the 2020 prize (to be awarded in June 2021) and henceforth, audience voting by the public will count for 50 per cent of the vote.

The most recent winner (2019) was the God Exists, Her Name Is Petrunija, by Macedonian director Teona Strugar Mitevska.

History

Creation and aims
The award was created in 2007. The name of the prize originates from the Latin word for "light", lux, with the award named in honour of the Lumière Brothers, who invented cinematography. The word origin is related to the aim of the award, which is to illuminate public debate on European integration and to facilitate the diffusion of European films in the European Union".

The symbol of the LUX Prize is the Tower of Babel, and the trophy reflects the shape of a tower. It is "a symbol of history where linguistic and cultural diversity join forces". It was designed by Belgian artist Jocelyne Coster.

The European Parliament believes that films help to instigate debate and raise awareness of socio-political issues in Europe, especially with regard to European integration, thus helping to forge and celebrate a stronger European identity and values. The prize also helps to publicise and encourage distribution of European films in the European Union and throughout the world, which otherwise may not get widespread distribution owing to language and other barriers.

Earlier editions
For the first edition of the prize, three films were shortlisted by a 17-member panel, comprising mainly people in the film industry, who viewed 800 feature films produced in Europe in the year from May 2006 to May 2007. The first LUX Prize was awarded to Turkish-born German director Fatih Akin, for his film The Edge of Heaven.

The jury members were appointed by the European Parliament Committee on Culture and Education, and it was planned that a third of the jury would be rotated each year. All members of the European Parliament were able to watch the final three films, but only those who have seen all three qualify for voting rights.

The producers of the ten shortlisted films are required to provide digital copies in the form of DVDs, Vimeo link, or OpenDCP for the members of the European Parliament. In 2015, the shortlisted Son of Saul was disqualified when the production team refused to provide this, fearing that the film copies would be pirated.

In 2019, there were 21 members on the judging panel. The selection of the first 10 films was announced in March of that year, with the final three selected in July and the winner announced in Strasbourg on 27 November.

2020 changes
Partly in response to the COVID-19 pandemic in Europe, changes were announced to the name, the selection process and the timetabling of the LUX Award in September 2020. The European Parliament and the European Film Academy would be responsible for the management of the award, in partnership with the European Commission and the Europa Cinemas network. The name was changed to LUX – the European Audience Film Award by the European Parliament and the European Film Academy, with the abbreviated version LUX European Audience Film Award. The new format was announced by Sabine Verheyen, chair of the Culture Committee, at the 77th Venice International Film Festival.

There would henceforth be five nominees competing for the award, which would all be subtitled in 24 European languages, but due to the impact of the pandemic on the film industry, only three would be nominated for the first edition of the new format. The jury would remain similar, but the winner would be selected jointly by MEPs and the public, with each contributing 50 per cent towards the final vote.

Award process

Selection criteria
, films have to meet following eligibility criteria:
 Fiction or documentary films (may be animated)
 Minimum length of 60 minutes
 Produced or co-produced in a European Union country or in Iceland, Norway, Albania, Bosnia and Herzegovina or Montenegro, under the Creative Europe/Media Programme.
 Illustrates the universality of European values and the diversity of European culture, and raise awareness of social or political issues
 Released for the first time between May 1 of the previous year and June 1 of the current year. For the 2021 edition, the release period was expanded, from 1 June 2019 until 12 September 2020, including online releases.

Preselection

Ten films are shortlisted, and three of these are selected for the final competition. After three (five after 2021) films have been selected from the 10 preselected films, these films are subtitled into the 24 official EU languages, and they are screened in all EU countries during the "LUX Film Days". In the 2020 edition, no preselection was hold, announcing directly the three nominated films.

2020 selection and voting timetable
In 2020, the European Film Awards Ceremony was supposed to take place in Reykjavík, Iceland, on 12 December. Due to the COVID-19 Pandemic, the Ceremony took place the scheduled day in a virtual format broadcast and streamed from the European Film Academy site in Berlin, where the three nominated films were announced. The three nominated films were chosen by a selection panel  consisting of 21 people: Mike Downey (Ireland), Honorary President of the LUX European Audience Film Award, Chairman of the European Film Academy; Jürgen Biesing (Germany), Producer, European Film Awards; Peter Bognar (Hungary), Distributor, Festival Programmer; Mihai Christian Chirilov (Romania), Film Critic, Artistic Director of TIFF; Ditte Daugbjerg Chistensen (Denmark), Øst for Paradis Cinema, Managing director & Head of distribution; José Luis Cienfuegos (Spain),  Director of the Sevilla European Film Festival; Fatima Djoumer, International relations and events administrator, Europa Cinéma; Juliette Duret (Belgium), Head of Cinema, BOZAR; Jakub Duszynski (Poland), Distributor, GUTEK Film, Co-President Europa Distribution; Giorgio Gosetti (Italy), Artistic Director of Venice Days Film Festival; Vanessa Henneman (Netherlands), Talent manager/agent; Mathilde Henrot (France), Founder of Festival Scope; Matthias Holz (Sweden), Cinema exhibitor and Programming Manager; Yorgos Krassakopoulos (Greece), Head of Programming Thessaloniki Film Festival, Film Critic; Christophe Leparc (France), Secretary General of Director's Fortnight , Cannes Film Festival; Susan Newman-Baudais (Ireland), Eurimages. Head of Programme – Co-production; Karel Och (Czech Republic), Film Critic and Artistic Director of Karlovy Vary Film Festival; Mira Stavela (Bulgaria), Managing Director Sofia IFF; Teona Strugar Mitevska (North Macedonia), Film Director; Mantė Valiūnaitė (Lithuania), Artistic Director, Vilnius Film Festival; Maria Silvia Gatta (Italy), Observer.

The nominated films, after subtitling in the 24 official languages, are being screened across Europe until May 2021. Between 10 and 16 May 2021 the "LUX Audience Week" takes place, with simultaneous screenings and debates organised across the continent. The public is able to vote by ranking the nominated films, awarding them one to five stars, and the totals will represent 50 per cent of the vote, with the other 50 per cent going to the MEPs. Voting period closes on 23 May 2021.

The winning film will be announced at the LUX Award Ceremony on 9 June 2021, during a plenary sitting of the European Parliament in Strasbourg, France, as in previous editions. The Parliament President presents the award to the laureate in front of the MEPs and representatives from the other films in competition.

2020 Voting process

The audience can cast their votes for all three nominated films from 13 December 2020 until 23 May 2021 on the Lux award website. Audiences will be able to rate each film via this website. Members of the European Parliament will also vote, from March until 23 May 2021 via a dedicated voting page of the institution. Ratings can be changed an unlimited number of times until the voting closes. The last vote counts.

The final ranking will be determined by combining the public vote and the vote by the Members of the European Parliament, with each group weighing 50%.

Pre-2020 timetable and process

Winners and nominees
Winners are listed first and highlighted in bold.

2000s

2010s

2020s

See also
European Film Academy Lux Award
European Border Breakers Award
Film Award of the Council of Europe
Nordic Council Film Prize

References

Further reading

External links

European film awards
Lists of films by award
European Parliament
Orders, decorations, and medals of the European Union
Awards established in 2007